USS Prevail may refer to the following ships operated by the United States Navy or United States Military Sealift Command:

 , a  during World War II
 , a 

United States Navy ship names